St. Hubert Catholic High School for Girls is a private Catholic preparatory school for girls located in the Holmesburg neighborhood Philadelphia, Pennsylvania. With over 425 students, it is the largest all-girls school in Philadelphia. 

The school is named after St. Hubert, the patron saint of hunters, and is under direction of the Archdiocese of Philadelphia.

History
The grounds of the school was originally home to a Catholic parish which was built in 1924 for German-speaking immigrants. On September 8, 1941, the school was officially opened. At its opening, the student body numbered 631, with 20 sisters serving in the faculty. Since 1941, over 21,000 students have graduated from St. Hubert. St. Hubert is the largest all-girls school in the archdiocese in Philadelphia. The mascot is a deer named Bambie.

From circa 1997 to 2012 the enrollment declined by 55%, the sharpest decrease of any senior high school in the Philadelphia archdiocese, and in 2012 the campus was 40% occupied. The Archdiocese of Philadelphia used the lower enrollment and a budget shortfall of $624,480 from 2006 to 2012 as reasons to have the campus closed. The archdiocese announced on January 6, 2012, that the school would close in June 2012 due to declining enrollment as part of the 2012 Archdiocese of Philadelphia school closings; a final decision on February 24, 2012, reversed that decision. People wishing to save the school held a fundraiser to generate funds needed to keep it open.

Athletics
The high school is home to the largest female athletic program in Philadelphia, with four intramural sports teams and 14 varsity teams. The four intramural sports include flag football, volleyball, badminton, and indoor soccer. Girls can make teams with their friends and play these sports for fun without competing against other schools. The 14 varsity sports at St. Hubert Catholic High School for Girls include cross country, field hockey, soccer, tennis, volleyball, golf, basketball, bowling, cheerleading, indoor track and field, swimming, outdoor track and field, softball, and lacrosse. St. Hubert also has experienced many athletic accomplishments and has won some championships over the years, including tennis, bowling, and soccer. St. Hubert was the first high school to have a women's golf team. To help sponsor the athletics and make sure they run smoothly, there is an Athletic Association that oversees the athletic related events.

The 2022-23 Saint Hubert Varsity and JV Gold Cheerleading won first place at the NCA competition.

Extra-curricular activities
St. Hubert offers its students over 40 clubs in which to participate. Among the most popular are:Academic clubs
 National Honor Society
 Mathletes

Arts & Culture clubs
 Art Club
 Black Student Union
 Drama Club
 Dance Club
 Chorus
 Hand bell Choir
 Orchestra
 String Ensemble
 Concert Band
 Chamber Ensemble
 Bambies United

(some of which perform at the end of the academic year)

Cause-related clubs
 Community Service Corps
 Respect for Life Club
 SADD (Students Against Destructive Decisions)

Non-competitive clubs
 Intramural Volleyball, Flag Football, Basketball, Badminton

There is a Student Council, which is an excellent student body that plans many events throughout the year and helps the school run smoothly. The Bambie Ambassadors serve as representatives to the school and everything for which it stands. 
St. Hubert also has the distinction of having the largest orchestra in Northeast Philadelphia; the school's ensemble composed of most instruments in an orchestra. 
Tally-Ho is the school's newspaper; Calling Echo, the school's yearbook.

Saint Hubert also offers 10 AP courses and 36 Honors courses. They have a Chrome Book program with a ratio of one Chrome Book per student.

Notes and references

https://whyy.org/articles/racist-video-protest-philly-catholic-high-school/

External links
St. Hubert Catholic High School for Girls
Instagram
Twitter
Facebook

Roman Catholic Archdiocese of Philadelphia
Girls' schools in Pennsylvania
Roman Catholic secondary schools in Philadelphia
Educational institutions established in 1941
1941 establishments in Pennsylvania
Northeast Philadelphia